Football Club Olimpiya Savyntsi or Olympia Savyntsi is a Ukrainian amateur football team from Savyntsi, Myrhorod Raion. In 2020 the team won the Amateur Cup.

Previously in 1976–1985 Savyntsi was represented by another football team from the local "Bolshevik" collective farm. In 2011 the team was reanimated at the agricultural company "Savyntsi". Since 2017, the club participates in the Ukrainian Amateur Cup.

Honours
 Ukrainian Amateur Cup
 Winner(s) (1): 2019–20
 Runner(s)-up (1): 2020–21
 Poltava Oblast championship
 Winner(s) (4): 2016, 2017, 2018, 2019
 Poltava Oblast cup
 Winner(s) (5): 2014, 2015, 2016, 2017, 2018
 Runner(s)-up (1): 2019

Players

Current squad

References

External links
 Club's info. Ukrainian football.at (archived)
 Olimpiya Savyntsi at AAFU

 
Amateur football clubs in Ukraine
Association football clubs established in 2011
2011 establishments in Ukraine
Football clubs in Poltava Oblast